Utangarðsmenn (literally Outsiders in Icelandic) was an Icelandic punk band formed in 1979 and was most active in the early 1980s, becoming one of the most popular bands in the country for that period.

The band was composed Bubbi Morthens, Mick Pollock, Danny Pollock, Magnús Stefánsson and Rúnar Erlingsson. They released two albums; Geislavirkir in 1980 and Í upphafi skyldi endinn skoða in 1981 and one mini album 45RPM in 1981. Utangarðsmenn had a brief comeback in 2000 and release of compilation album Fuglinn er floginn.

Discography

Albums
Studio albums
1980: Geislavirkir
1981: Í upphafi skyldi endinn skoða
Live albums
1994: Utangarðsmenn (compilation)
Compilation albums
2000: Fuglinn er floginn (on Bad Taste record label)

EPs
1980: Ha ha ha (Rækjureggae)
1981: 45 RPM

Appearances in compilations
1981: Flugur
1981: Gæðapopp
1981: Northern Lights Playhouse 
1982: Næst á Dagskrá
1985: Með Lögum Skal Land Byggja 
1998: Nælur 
2006: Rokkskífan

References

Icelandic punk rock groups